Nataliya Grigoryeva (née Dorofeyeva on 3 December 1962) is a retired athlete who specialized in the 100 metres hurdles. She represented the Soviet Union and Ukraine, and holds the Ukrainian record.

Career
Grigoryeva was born in Ishimbay in today's Bashkortostan, and represented the club Spartak in Kharkiv. She finished fourth at the 1988 Olympic Games, won the gold medal at the 1990 Goodwill Games, and won the bronze medal at the 1991 World Championships. She was caught for doping around this point in her career.

She also competed at the 1990 European Championships,
 the 1996 Olympic Games and the 1997 World Indoor Championships without reaching the final.

Her personal best time was 12.39 seconds, achieved in July 1991 in Kiev. This is the current Ukrainian record, even though she achieved it whilst representing the Soviet Union. As of 2015, this time still ranks her in the top 10 on the world all-time list. In the 60 metres hurdles she had a personal best time of 7.85 seconds, achieved in February 1990 in Chelyabinsk.

Achievements

References 

1962 births
Living people
People from Ishimbay
Soviet female hurdlers
Ukrainian female hurdlers
Ukrainian people of Russian descent
Athletes (track and field) at the 1988 Summer Olympics
Olympic athletes of the Soviet Union
Athletes (track and field) at the 1996 Summer Olympics
Olympic athletes of Ukraine
Doping cases in athletics
Ukrainian sportspeople in doping cases
World Athletics Championships medalists
Goodwill Games medalists in athletics
Competitors at the 1990 Goodwill Games